is a railway station in the city of Oyama, Tochigi, Japan, operated by the East Japan Railway Company (JR East).

Lines

Station layout
The station consists of two opposed side platforms, with an elevated station building. The station is staffed.

Platforms

History
Mamada Station opened on 1 April 1894. The current station building was completed in February 1979. On 1 April 1987 the station came under the control of JR East with the privatization of Japanese National Railways (JNR).

In fiscal 2019, the station was used by an average of 4225 passengers daily (boarding passengers only). The passenger figures for previous years are as shown below.

Surrounding area
 
 Oyama Otome Post Office
 Oyama City Museum

See also
 List of railway stations in Japan

References

External links

 JR East station information 

Railway stations in Tochigi Prefecture
Utsunomiya Line
Stations of East Japan Railway Company
Railway stations in Japan opened in 1894
Oyama, Tochigi